Paweł Charucki (born 14 October 1988) is a Polish cyclist who rides for .

Major results
2010
 1st  U23 National Road Race Championships
2016
 3rd Memorial Grundmanna I Wizowskiego
 3rd Korona Kocich Gór

References

External links
Cycling News profile
Cycling archives profile

1988 births
Living people
Polish male cyclists
Place of birth missing (living people)